Działyński Palace in Poznań, Poland is a Baroque palace built in  1773 - 1776. The building features a rich stucco-decorated interior of its "Red Hall" and a classicist façade decorated with sculptures. The palace serves as one of the locations of Kórnik Library today.

References

External links 

Buildings and structures in Poznań
Tourist attractions in Poznań
Libraries in Poland
Baroque palaces in Poland
Houses completed in 1776